Jiří Huška (born 27 January 1988) is a Czech football player who currently plays for FK Blansko.

References
 Guardian Football
 
 
 Player profile at fczbrno.cz

1988 births
Living people
Czech footballers
Czech First League players
Czech National Football League players
FC Zbrojovka Brno players
FK Blansko players
Association football defenders
Footballers from Brno